The Canton of Les Saintes is a former canton in the Arrondissement of Basse-Terre in the department of Guadeloupe. It had 2,882 inhabitants (2012). It was disbanded following the French canton reorganisation which came into effect in March 2015. It consisted of 2 communes, which joined the canton of Trois-Rivières in 2015.

Municipalities
The canton included 2 communes:
Terre-de-Haut
Terre-de-Bas

See also
Cantons of Guadeloupe
Communes of Guadeloupe
Arrondissements of Guadeloupe

References

Saintes
Les Saintes representation into Guadeloupe administration
2015 disestablishments in France
States and territories disestablished in 2015